Guilherme Thiago Teixeira (born 30 January 1992) is a Brazilian footballer who plays for Figueirense as a defender.

Career statistics

References

External links

1992 births
Living people
Brazilian footballers
Association football defenders
Campeonato Brasileiro Série B players
Campeonato Brasileiro Série C players
Campeonato Brasileiro Série D players
Marília Atlético Clube players
Sociedade Esportiva Matonense players
Coimbra Esporte Clube players
Grêmio Novorizontino players
Clube Atlético Linense players
Vila Nova Futebol Clube players
Paysandu Sport Club players
Mirassol Futebol Clube players
Esporte Clube Noroeste players